A list of films produced in the United Kingdom in 1962 (see 1962 in film):

1962

See also
1962 in British music
1962 in British radio
1962 in British television
1962 in the United Kingdom

References

External links

1962
Films
British